Mammoth Biosciences is a biotechnology company based in South San Francisco, California developing diagnostic tests using CRISPR-Cas12a. The company was founded in 2017 by Jennifer Doudna, Janice Chen, Trevor Martin, and Lucas Harrington of the University of California, Berkeley. Mammoth signed agreements in December 2019 and January 2020 with Horizon Discovery to combine Mammoth's intellectual property in CRISPR with Horizon's expertise in Chinese hamster ovary cells. Also in 2020, both Mammoth Biosciences and Sherlock Biosciences from the Broad Institute used their similar CRISPR technologies to develop tests for COVID-19. The technology, which is owned under the trademark of DETECTR BOOST, has been contracted to be manufactured by Merck & Co.

See also
Sherlock Biosciences

References

American companies established in 2017
Biotechnology companies of the United States
Health care companies based in California
Jennifer Doudna
Life sciences industry
Medical diagnosis